The European Diving Technology Committee eV. (EDTC) is an association registered in Kiel, Federal Republic of Germany for the purpose of making professional diving safer by creating international standards. Membership is open to all countries of the continent of Europe, with each country having one representative from the medical, industrial, government and trade union sectors. Some major diving industry associations are also involved. As of May 2016, 22 nations and 6 international non-governmental organisations were represented in the EDTC.

Membership
Membership is open to any country within the continent of Europe, and specialist organisations.

Countries represented include: Austria, Belgium, Croatia, Czech Republic, Denmark, Estonia, Finland, France, Germany, Italy, Latvia, Norway, Poland, Portugal, Romania, Spain, Slovak Republic, Sweden, Switzerland, The Netherlands, Turkey and the United Kingdom.

Institutions represented include: International Marine Contractors Association (IMCA), International Association of Oil and Gas Producers (OGP), International Transport Workers' Federation (ITF), International Diving Schools Association (IDSA), European Underwater Federation (EUF) and International Diving Regulators and Certifiers Forum (IDRCF).

Publications
EDTC has published guidance documents to be used as a basis for national requirements. These include:
 Guidance for Diving on Renewable Energy Projects - Document No: EDTC-GD-001
 Goal-setting Principles for Harmonised Diving Standards in Europe - Document No: EDTC-GS-001-1/15
 Training Objectives for a Diving Medicine Physician
 Training standards for diving and hyperbaric medicine
 Offshore Diving Regulations: Different countries - European diving regulations.doc
 European Diving Technology Committee Diving Industry Personnel Competence Standards  
 Medical Assessment of Working Divers. Fitness to Dive Standards of European Diving Technology Committee. Edited by Jűrg Wendling, David Elliott and Tor Nome. Published by European Diving Technology Committee, 2004. .

References

Diving medicine